Olivier D. A. Gh. Maingain (born 3 August 1958) is a Belgian francophone politician and former president of DéFI.

Biography
After graduating as Master of Laws he qualified as a lawyer in 1982. In 1983 he became president of the FDF Youth. He was elected as a city councillor of Brussels in 1988. He entered the Parliament of the Brussels-Capital Region in 1989 and he was a Member of the Chamber of Representatives from 1991 to 2019. He became the president of the FDF (English: Democratic Front of the Francophones) in 1995. In 1995 too, he became an alderman of Brussels.  He was elected as a city councillor of the municipality of Woluwe-Saint-Lambert (Sint-Lambrechts-Woluwe in Dutch) in 2006, where the city council voted him for mayor.  In the 2007 elections Maingain received 45,439 votes in the electoral district Brussels-Halle-Vilvoorde.

Among the legal measures sponsored by him are a law protecting the confidentiality of journalists' sources and the inclusion in the Belgian Constitution of the principle of the abolition of the death penalty. His efforts also led to the main square of Brussels (the Grand-Place or Grote Markt) being placed on the UNESCO list of World Heritage Sites.

He is critical of the weakness of the Belgian central government and states that the Belgian state does not sufficiently protect the rights of French-speaking Belgian citizens. He feels that supporting a Belgian federated state is "honourable" and is against the "eagerness of certain Flemish political parties to destroy the reality of Brussels". In his view the main political leaders in Flanders show a cynical pragmatism in belittling the role of central government and building up the importance of the region of Flanders. His overly frank style of speaking and the often stigmatising tone of his arguments have caused him to be extremely unpopular in Flanders.

According to a 2009 survey of the Flemish newspaper Het Nieuwsblad, the best and most respected mayor of Brussels would be Olivier Maingain, scoring 7.5/10. The survey was conducted among the opposition parties in the local councils of the 19 municipalities of Brussels, which mainly consists of politicians from the VLD and the CD&V. The Flemish opposition welcomed among other things the mayor's attitude towards the Flemish population of his town.

Controversies
In the run-up to the federal elections of 10 June 2007, he printed and distributed unilingual French election pamphlets in the unilingual Dutch-speaking town of Merchtem.

In 2010 he compared the non-appointments of three French-speaking candidate-mayors by the Flemish government with practices similar to those during the "Nazi occupation" of Belgium.

Notes

External links

1958 births
Living people
People from Woluwe-Saint-Lambert
Members of the Belgian Federal Parliament
DéFI politicians
21st-century Belgian politicians